Chandrapur Assembly Constituency may refer to 
 Chandrapur, Chhattisgarh Assembly constituency
 Chandrapur, Maharashtra Assembly constituency